Myles Mark Judd (born 24 February 1999) is an English professional footballer who plays as a right-back for Dover Athletic.

Playing career

Leyton Orient
Judd made his debut for Leyton Orient at the age of 16 years and 189 days, coming on for Lloyd James 83 minutes into the 2–1 Football League Trophy defeat to Luton Town at Kenilworth Road on 1 September 2015.

Judd made his league debut for Orient in the 1–0 home defeat to Exeter City on 22 November 2016.

He joined Barnet on loan on 30 December 2020. He was sent off on his debut against Boreham Wood after a deliberate handball on the goal line. After making nine league appearances on loan for Barnet, Judd returned to parent club Leyton Orient on 18 March 2021. Judd was released by Leyton Orient at the end of the 2020–21 season.

Dover Athletic
On 12 January 2022, Judd joined the National League's bottom side Dover Athletic on a non-contract basis. Judd was released following relegation, being offered the chance to return to the club over pre-season to prove his fitness. On 12 July 2022, Judd re-signed for the club on a permanent contract.

Statistics

Honours

Club
Leyton Orient
National League: 2018–19

References

External links

1999 births
Living people
Footballers from the London Borough of Redbridge
English footballers
Association football defenders
Leyton Orient F.C. players
Hastings United F.C. players
Barnet F.C. players
Dover Athletic F.C. players
English Football League players
National League (English football) players
Isthmian League players